This is a list of films / movies produced in Nigeria by year of release.

Before 1970

1970s

1980s

1990s

1990

1991

1992

1993

1994

1995

1996

1997

1998

1999

2000s

2000

2001

2002

2003

2004

2005

2006

2007

2008

2009

2010s

2010

2011

2012

2013

2014

2015

2016

2017

2018

2019

2020s

2020

2021

2022

2023

References

External links
Nigerian films at the Internet Movie Database

Lists of Nigerian films by year